Harry Lloyd McGee (April 27, 1905 – October 28, 1983) was an American football player. He played college football for Kansas State and professional football in the National Football League (NFL) for the Cleveland Bulldogs (1927), Staten Island Stapletons (1929, 1931), Newark Tornadoes (1930). He appeared in 14 NFL games, six as a starter.

References

1905 births
1983 deaths
Kansas State Wildcats football players
Cleveland Bulldogs players
Staten Island Stapletons players
Newark Tornadoes players
Players of American football from Kansas